The Bicester School (previously Bicester Community College) is a mixed, multi-heritage, secondary school, with 963 students (including a sixth form). It is situated in Bicester, Oxfordshire, England, and occupies a  site leading off Queens Avenue.

The school's sports facilities are used by Bicester Athletic Club, which has been awarded National Lottery funding to add all-weather surfaces to the sports field's jumping and throwing event areas.

History
The Bicester School was formed as a new comprehensive school in 1966. It was created by the merger of Highfield Secondary Modern School and Bicester Grammar School, who had shared the current site since 1963. Bicester Grammar School had previously been situated at the junction of London Road and Launton Road.

The school has been a Government-designated specialist Technology College since 1998. In May 2011 Bicester Community College received the Most Improved Award from the Specialist Schools and Academies Trust (SSAT) for improving its GCSE results by 20 percentage points from 2007 to 2010. The college received congratulations for significantly improving its 5+ A*–C results including GCSE English and Mathematics.

Ofsted rated the school 'Satisfactory' in its 2010 inspection report. After another inspection in 2012, Ofsted downgraded their rating to 'Inadequate', which is the lowest of the four tiers ranked by Ofsted. The other tiers are 'Requires improvement' (previously 'Satisfactory'), 'Good' and 'Outstanding'.

Achievement of pupils, quality of teaching, behaviour and safety of pupils and leadership and management were all deemed 'Inadequate'. Principal Jason Clarke responded to the report, stating that "[the school is] very disappointed by the outcome of the inspection and the impact it may have on hard work undertaken since the last inspection two years ago. The report acknowledges the recent positive impact of many initiatives currently in place and under way. My greatest disappointment is the grade for behaviour, which does not truly reflect the positive attitude and pride the vast majority of our students have for their school."

The school was put in special measures in February 2013.

Oxfordshire county council subsequently asked the Department for Education for permission to remove the board of governors, with the request being granted on Thursday 21 February 2013. A new five person interim executive board (IEB) was put in place to oversee the school.

On Monday 18 March 2013 the Principal Jason Clarke left the school by mutual agreement with the IEB. The IEB announced the appointment of neighbouring Cooper School head Ben Baxter as interim head from Monday 15 April.

An Ofsted inspection in 2014 increased the school's rating to 'Good' across all categories. The requirement for special measures was removed.

In August 2015, Bicester Community College converted to academy status and was renamed The Bicester School. The school is now sponsored by Activate Learning.

Performance
Bicester Community College students achieved their best-ever results in 2010.

GCSE
Examination Performance 2010
 Students achieving at least five A* to Cs GCSEs 69% 
 Students achieving at least five A* to Cs GCSEs including English and Maths 55%  
 Students achieving at least five A* to Gs GCSEs  99%

Sixth Form 2010 Success
 A Level Grades awarded at D or E  0.98%  
 A Levels awarded at f grade  78%

The college gained School Achievement awards in 2001 and 2002 in recognition of the significant improvements in its examination results. In 2006 Bicester achieved membership of the Most Improved Specialist Schools Club after the number of pupils getting five or more A*–C grades at GCSE rose from 40 per cent in 2002 to 50 per cent in 2005. The results dropped in 2006 with only 36 per cent achieving the benchmark five or more GCSE passes at A*–C, but the 2007 results were a significant improvement with 52 per cent gaining five or more GCSE passes at the appropriate grades.

There have been successful Oxbridge applications from the school in the last ten years, and the school has sent students to other top UK universities, including King's College London, the London School of Economics and Political Science, University College London, the University of Warwick, the University of Bristol and the University of Nottingham. The University of Reading, Coventry University, the University of Southampton, Oxford Brookes University and Nottingham Trent University are also popular destinations for former students of the school.

Performing arts
In 2008 the college was awarded the Artsmark Gold Award in recognition of its achievements in the arts.

Bicester Community College has a performing arts department, with a jazz band, choirs, wind band, string orchestra, chamber ensembles, a boys' dance company and dance clubs.

The orchestra and jazz band went on a trip to Germany in July 2007, performing three concerts.

The orchestra and jazz band also visited Belgium in July 2009, performing at various venues and events, including The Last Post Ceremony at Menin Gate, Ypres.

Music and dance groups from the school performed at the MAD about Waddesdon festival in June 2010.

The department has put on shows, including Grease in 2006,The Sound of Music in 2007 and High School Musical in February 2008, Les Miserables in 2009 and Bugsy Malone in 2010.

References

External links
The Bicester School official website

Secondary schools in Oxfordshire
Educational institutions established in 1966
Bicester
1966 establishments in England
Academies in Oxfordshire